Club Sportiv Orășenesc Ovidiu, commonly known as CSO Ovidiu, or simply as Ovidiu, is a Romanian amateur football club based in Ovidiu, Constanța County, founded on 27 July 2004.

The club is currently playing in the Liga IV, Constanța County series.

History
In 2005–06 season, with Sevastian Iovănescu as a coach, Ovidenii won the Divizia D – Constanța County and the promotion play-off against Razim Jurilovca, the winner of the Divizia D – Tulcea County,  2–0 on neutral ground at Fetești.

At the end of the 2008–09 Liga III season, the club finished 2nd in its series and took part in the promotion playoff to the Liga II. However, the club lost and then withdrew, being enrolled for the 2009–10 season in the Liga IV.

Honours
Liga III
Runners-up (1): 2008–09

Liga IV – Constanța County
Winners (2): 2005–06, 2020–21

League history

Notable managers
 Sevastian Iovănescu
 Cătălin Anghel

References

External links
 

Association football clubs established in 2004
Football clubs in Constanța County
Liga III clubs
Liga IV clubs
2004 establishments in Romania